Kotzian is a surname. Notable people with the surname include:

Ditte Kotzian (born 1979), German diver
Monika Kotzian, Polish para-snowboarder